Namazpur is a village in Pirojpur District in the Barisal Division of southwestern Bangladesh.

References

Villages in Pirojpur District
Villages in Barisal Division